Al Rojo Vivo is the eighth studio album of Puerto Rican singer Ednita Nazario. It was released in 1983.  In the United States, it bore her name as a title.

Track listing
 "Ese muchacho"
 "Dicen"
 "Frente a ella"
 "Chico fisico"
 "La prohibida"
 "Que va"
 "Hasta cuando y hasta donde"
 "Mi pequeño amor"
 "Mañana"
 "Machismo"

Singles
 La Prohibida
 Mi Pequeño Amor (con Laureano Brizuela)
 Te Amaría
 Amándote

References

Personnel
 Produced by Laureano Brizuela

Ednita Nazario albums
1983 albums